Gaspare Celio (1571 in Rome–November 24, 1640 in Rome) was an Italian painter of the late-Mannerist and early-Baroque period, active mainly in his native city of Rome.

Celio was the pupil of Circignani, according to Baglione, but of Cristoforo Roncalli, if we are to believe Abate Titi.

His first commissions in about 1596 were completed with Giuseppe Valeriano who asked Celio to decorate the Chapel of the Passion in the church of il Gesù in Rome. This work was done after the design of P. Giovanni Battista Fiammeri. He also paints a Madonna and Bambino, now in Santa Maria del Carmine, a The Passage of Moses through the Red Sea (1607) in a vault of the Palazzo Mattei, a Death of the Giants. He painted a St Francis for the altar of the Ospizio at Ponte Sisto. He painted a History of S. Raimondo at the Santa Maria sopra Minerva.

Between 1620 -1638 he helps publish a guide to the churches and artwork in Rome (Memoria delli nomi dell'artefici delle pitture che sono in alcune chiese, facciate e palazzi di Roma). He engraved antique statues. He briefly worked in Parma as a painter for the court of Ranuccio Farnese.

He was buried in the Basilica of Santa Maria del Popolo, Rome, where still stands his funeral monument.

Works
 Works at the Capilla della Passione (1596), iglesia del Gesù, Rome
 Virgin and Child or Madonna (Santa Maria del Carmine)
 The Passage of Moses Through the Red Sea (1607), in the vault of Palazzo Mattei
 Death of the Giants Palazzo Mattei, Rome
 Works at the Capilla Altieri (1622), San Francesco a Ripa, Rome
 Ludovica Albertoni
 Saint Charles Borromeo
 Holy Family and Saint Anne
 St. Francis, an altar of the Ospizio at Ponte Sisto
 History of Saint Raymond, Santa Maria sopra Minerva
 Battle Scene (Borghese Gallery, Rome)

References

Further reading

Sydney Joseph Freedberg (1978). Paintings in Italy, 1500-1600
The Grove Dictionary of Art, Macmillan Publishers (2000)
José Luis Colomer, Arte y diplomacia de la monarquía hispánica en el siglo XVII (Art and Diplomacy in the Spanish Monarchy in the 17th Century), CEEH (2003). 
Comune di Bozzolo; Gruppo Culturale Per Bozzolo (a cura di), Il Principe e la Città. Giulio Cesare Gonzaga di Bozzolo, Modena, 1994. ISBN non esistente.

1571 births
1640 deaths
Painters from Rome
16th-century Italian painters
Italian male painters
17th-century Italian painters
Italian art historians